Erysiphe brunneopunctata is a plant pathogen that causes powdery mildew on monkey flower.

References

External links

Fungal plant pathogens and diseases
Eudicot diseases
brunneopunctata
Fungi described in 1984